Macedonia competed at the 2018 European Athletics Championships in Berlin, Germany, from 6–12 August 2018. A delegation of 2 athletes were sent to represent the country.

The following athletes were selected to compete by the Athletic Federation of Macedonia.

 Men 
 Track and road

Women
 Track and road

References

Nations at the 2018 European Athletics Championships
North Macedonia at the European Athletics Championships
European Athletics Championships